The Beautiful Leukanida is a 1912 Russian short film directed and written by Władysław Starewicz.

Plot 
The film speaks of two bugs which fight over a beautiful female bug.

Restoration 
In 2012 Gosfilmofond of Russia restored the cartoon. The author of the version was Nikolai Izvolov. In addition to restoring the image, the voice-over narration of the events on the screen was performed by Alexander Negreba. 

"Sentimental Waltz" by Pyotr Tchaikovsky (1881) was used as the musical background. The premiere screening of the restored version took place as part of the 16th White Pillars Archival Film Festival 2012, held from January 30 to February 3, 2012.

References

External links 
 

1912 films
1910s Russian-language films
Russian silent short films
Russian black-and-white films
Films about insects
Films of the Russian Empire
1912 short films